Holy day refers to a religious commemorative day or festival:

 Liturgical year, determines when feast days, including celebrations of saints, are to be observed
 List of movable Eastern Christian observances
 List of movable Western Christian observances
 Holy day of obligation, in Catholicism, days on which the faithful are expected to attend Mass
 Festival (Anglicanism), a type of observance in the Churches of the Anglican Communion
 List of Hindu festivals
 Buddhist holidays
 Islamic holidays
 Jewish holidays
 Heathen holidays, in Neopaganism
 Zoroastrian festivals

See also 
 Holiday
 List of commemorative days, which also contains a number of religious commemorative days and festivals
 Sabbath